Mutineers' Moon is a 1991 science fiction novel by American writer David Weber. It is the first book in his Dahak trilogy, and is available in the Baen Free Library.

It was later republished in the Empire from the Ashes compendium.

Plot summary 

The book’s premise is that the Moon is a massive space ship controlled by a self-aware computer that wants its rightful crew back aboard.

Prologue
The book begins with a prologue recording a mutiny aboard the planetoid-sized Utu-class starship of the Fourth Imperium (a more-than-55,000-year-old technologically advanced multi-star system empire), the Dahak, led by its Chief of Engineering, the ambitious and psychopathic Captain Anu and Commander Inanna. Anu's reason for mutiny is to lead his followers to refuge on a planet where presumably the genocidal wrath of the "Achuultani", a mysterious alien race that periodically exterminates all intelligent life it can find, which has also destroyed the previous three Imperiums and the dinosaurs, will pass over them.

The loyal crew is taken by surprise, and unable to defeat the mutineers. Faced with no choice, the captain orders Dahak to execute "Red Two Internal"—a command which will flood the entirety of the interior of the vessel with deadly substances; this action will force mutineers and loyalists to the lifeboats, and the vessel will then, acting on other orders from the captain, allow back in the Dahak only the loyal crew and blow the mutineers into space. Red Two unfortunately entails the death of the captain as well; no one is unable to command Dahak to destroy the mutineers as they leave aboard warships, not lifeboats, nor undo Anu's systematic sabotage of the power generators, intended to kill Dahak by starving it of power and thereby rendering it open to conquest by Anu's forces.

Unfortunately for Anu, Dahaks computer systems catch the sabotage before it utterly wrecks all the power plants, but the damage is so severe that it is forced to cease all communications and non-necessary expenditures of power. The damage takes decades to repair—by which point none of the loyal crew is still alive or able to contact the Dahak. Overpowered by the mutineers, the loyalists have been systematically exterminated. This places Dahak in a dilemma in which it cannot return to the Imperium as it has been ordered to, but nor can it exterminate the mutineers as other, equally important, orders dictate. This lasts for approximately 50,000 years, until the Earthlings' early space program sends up one Lieutenant Commander Colin MacIntyre to map the dark side of the heavenly body Dahak had camouflaged itself as—the Moon—as a "dress rehearsal" for a similar trip scheduled for Mars.

Story
Colin's mission is hijacked by Dahak and his death is faked; as had MacIntyre returned with his data, Dahaks cover would have been blown. While MacIntyre is aboard, Dahaks AI explains the situation to him, and prevails upon him to, as a descendant of the loyalists, become Dahaks newest captain, and to exterminate the mutineers—quickly, as Imperium installations are being destroyed, signs of the start of the latest Achuultani incursion. MacIntyre reluctantly accepts; the first step to making him the captain is to massively revamp his body surgically, granting him superhuman resilience, speed, and strength, in addition to the built-in electronics granting matchless control of Imperium technology. While Dahak has known for millennia where Anu's forces have bunkered up—under the South Pole in Antarctica—their base is protected by extremely strong force fields, force fields so strong that to penetrate them and destroy the base would require Dahaks heavy weaponry, which would inevitably kill a significant percentage of the human population of Earth.

MacIntyre returns to his home to renew contacts with his elder brother, Sean, and to enlist him in a scheme to discover the mutineers' agent in the space program. It initially succeeds, but when he and Sean attempt to contact the agent, they discover their scan of the space program building was detected. MacIntyre and Sean fend off some of the mutineers (at the cost of Sean's life), but MacIntyre is rescued by an acquaintance, who sends him through a tunnel where he is captured by another group of mutineers.

This group, led by former missile tech Horus, was a dissident splinter faction of Anu's, which turned against him after the mutiny. Despite supporting Anu during the mutiny itself, Horus and his crew committed a double mutiny against Anu and fled into hiding on Earth. Once they reached Earth, they entered stasis so that the crew would survive however long it would take for civilization to reappear on Earth (Anu at the time enforced primitivism). Now, with civilization re-emerging on Earth, his group has begun a passive, behind-the-scenes war against Anu. Because they are heavily outnumbered in weaponry, they have been forced to always play it very carefully. As a result, the crew of the battleship has created a huge network of humans, many of whom are descendants of Nergals crew. However, the arrival of MacIntyre means that the end has begun, for Dahak has at last taken a hand in the game.

Eventually, this group and its battleship, the Nergal, joins MacIntyre, and they embark on a grand plan to destroy Anu: first, they rapidly and effectively destroy a number of important installations that Anu's forces are based in (convincing Anu to withdraw all of his important personnel back to the main base), then they have their agents inside the Antarctica base steal the codes to gain access for them; finally, they fake a defeat, and when Anu relaxes, certain that they were destroyed, their now-at-liberty agents send them the codes and they launch a full assault, backed up by Dahak's orbital weaponry.

The assault costs them dearly, but Anu and his forces are killed, with Commander Inanna's brain ripped out. With the revelation of Dahaks power, the world's governments have little choice but to submit to the Planetary Governor MacIntyre. However, Colin has little time to unify the world, because the Achuultani draws ever nearer, and the Imperium is silent, even when Dahaks communication systems are repaired. Finally, MacIntyre leaves the world under the care of old Horus, and departs for the nearest Fleet Imperium base, hoping to call upon Imperial assistance.

Concept and creation 
Author David Weber says the genesis for this book began with a question: "Assume that Earth doesn't actually have a Moon, but rather a giant starship disguised as our Moon which has been there for at least 50 or 60,000 years. Where did it come from, why did it come here, and why hasn't it left?" Weber says the answer to those questions built the foundation for this book and its sequels.

Cancelled anime adaptation 
A division of North American anime distributor A.D. Vision was working on an anime adaptation of this series, but it was cancelled with the 2009 bankruptcy of A.D. Vision.

References 

 Mutineers' Moon, David Weber; first published October 1991 by Baen Books. .

External links 
 The complete text of Mutineers' Moon is available for download or reading online at the Baen Free Library here. It can also be found here (the At All Costs CD).

1991 American novels
1991 science fiction novels
American science fiction novels
Baen Books available as e-books
Novels by David Weber
Novels set on the Moon
Space opera novels